The 1891 VMI Keydets football team represented the Virginia Military Institute (VMI) in their first season of organized football. In 1873, however, VMI played Washington and Lee in their only game of the season, losing 4–2. No coaching or player records are known from that game.

Schedule

References

VMI
VMI Keydets football seasons
College football undefeated seasons
VMI Keydets football